Paul Spencer Laurence Viney (born 4 September 1949) is a British auctioneer and valuer of fine art and antiques.

Career
Viney attended Rugby School from 1963 to 1968.

Viney began his career at Oxford's Ashmolean Museum, before working for the National Trust at Waddesdon Manor, the former Rothschild home where his paternal grandparents were châtelains.

He moved to Phillips, a British auction house, in 1971. He began as a porter, then became a general valuer, then vice-president in New York, then director in Oxford, main board director in London from 1978 to 1990, and European director from 1986 to 1992.

From 1984 to 2010, Viney conducted the Children in Need auctions with Sir Terry Wogan live on BBC Radio 2, raising over £5 million for the charity.

He appeared as a specialist on Antiques Roadshow from 1993 to 2013, and co-hosted series 29 in 2007.

Woolley & Wallis
For 20 years, Viney was chairman of Woolley & Wallis, a British auction house founded in 1884. While there, he oversaw the company's expansion, as well as the auctioning of a Benin Bronze, Keith Vaughan's "Sunbathers", some of Napoleon's personal documents, seven lots of Asian art for more than £1 million, and one of the largest spherical pearls in existence, which was bought by David Morris for £811,000.

Under Viney, they became the first regional auction house in the UK to sell a lot over £1m. They have since done so eight times, with an 18th-century Chinese jade buffalo sold in 2009 heading the list at £4m.

In 2019, Viney resigned from the chair. He had previously been the director of the company, beginning in 1995, until his resignation in 2021.

Memberships
From 2009 to 2013, Viney was Chairman of the Society of Fine Art Auctioneers (ASFAV).

He is a member of the Court of the Worshipful Company of Arts Scholars and thus a Freeman of the City of London. From 2018 to 2019, he was master of the company.

Personal life
In 1977, the engagement was announced of Viney to Sarah Tyrell, daughter of Mr C. W. Tyrrell of Briars Cross, Limpsfield Chart. They were married later that year.

References

Living people
1949 births
People educated at Rugby School
British auctioneers
Antiques experts
Leaders of organizations
BBC people